Novikov, Novikoff (masculine) or Novikova (feminine) is one of the most common Russian surnames. Derived from novik - a teenager on military service who comes from a noble, boyar or cossack family in Russia of 16th-18th centuries. It may refer to:

Novikov
Alexei Novikov (1916-1986), Soviet pilot and Hero of the Soviet Union
Alexey Novikov (painter) (b. 1931), Russian painter 
Alexey Novikov-Priboy (1877-1944), Russian writer
Alexander Novikov (1900-1976), Russian Marshal of Aviation, Double Hero of the Soviet Union
Alexander Novikov (mathematician), mathematician known for his work on stochastic processes
Alexander Vasilievich Novikov (b. 1953) (ru) - singer-songwriter
Anatoliy Novikov (1947–2022), Ukrainian judoka
Anatoly Novikov (composer) (1896-1984), Russian composer
Andrey Novikov (1889-1941), Russian writer
Andriy Novikov (born 1999), Ukrainian football player
Arkady Novikov (b.1962), Russian restaurateur
Artem Novikov (b 1987), Kyrgyzstani politician
Boris Novikov (sportsman) (1909-1989), Russian sportsman and trainer
Boris Novikov (1925-1997), Soviet actor
Dennis Novikov (b. 1993), American tennis player 
Dmitry Novikov (b. 1969), Soviet army officer and Hero of the Soviet Union
Evgeny Novikov (b. 1990), Russian rally driver
Ignatiy Novikov (1907-?), Soviet statesman
Igor Novikov (painter) (b. 1961),  Swiss-Russian painter Soviet Nonconformist Art, Switzerland
Igor Novikov (chess player) (b. 1962), Ukrainian then U.S. chess grandmaster
Igor Alexandrovich Novikov (1929-2007), Russian sportsman and trainer; former biathlon champion
Igor Dmitriyevich Novikov (b. 1935), Russian theoretical astrophysicist and cosmologist
Novikov self-consistency principle, principle to solve the problems of paradoxes in time travel, developed by him
Ilya Novikov, (b. 1982), Russian jurist
Ivan Novikov (1879-?), Russian novelist, playwright, and poet
Ivan Alexeyevich Novikov (1877-1959), Russian writer
Ivan Ivanovich Novikov (1916–2014), Russian scientist 
Jevgeni Novikov  (b. 1980), Estonian footballer
Konstantin Novikov (1919-1958), Soviet pilot and Hero of the Soviet Union 
Nikita Novikov (ice hockey) (b. 2003), Russian ice hockey player
Nikolai Vasilevich Novikov (1903-1989), Soviet ambassador to the United States
Nikolay Ivanovich Novikov (1744-1818), Russian writer and philanthropist
Nikolay Vasilyevich Novikov (1880-1957), Russian historian
, ((b. 1968) general director of Eksmo
Oleksii Novikov (born 1996), Ukrainian strongman and winner of World's Strongest Man
Pyotr Novikov (1901-1975), Russian mathematician
Sergei Novikov (mathematician) (b. 1938), Russian mathematician, son of Pyotr
Novikov conjecture, an unsolved problem in topology named for him
Sergei Borisovich Novikov (b. 1961), Soviet footballer
Sergei Valentinovich Novikov (b. 1979), Belarusian biathlete
Sergei Novikov (cross-country skier), Russian cross-country skier
Stepan Novikov, Russian grenadier who saved Surorov from a Turkish warrior in the Battle of Kinburn
Tanel-Eiko Novikov, Estonian percussionist
Vasily Loginovich Novikov (1915-1941), Soviet pilot and Hero of the Soviet Union
Vasily Mikhailovich Novikov (1910-1979), Soviet army officer and Hero of the Soviet Union      
Viktor Novikov (1913-1941), Soviet army officer and Hero of the Soviet Union
Vitali Novikov, Russian ice dancer.  
Vladimir Mikhaylovich Novikov (1907-1990), Russian poet
Vladimir Novikov (politician) (1907-2000), Soviet statesman
Vladimir Stepanovich Novikov (b. 1922), Soviet army officer and Hero of the Soviet Union
Yegor Novikov (1915-1941), Soviet pilot and Hero of the Soviet Union
Yuri Novikov (b. 1972), Kazakh footballer

Novikoff
Alex Benjamin Novikoff (1913–1987), Russian-born, American biologist
Ivan Novikoff (1899-2002), Russian born ballet master
Laurent Novikoff (1888-1956) 
Olga Novikoff (1840s-1925), Russian author and patriot
Tyrone Novikoff, American football player

Novikova
Anastasiya Novikova (1980-2004), NTK television announcer in Kazakhstan
Anastasiya Novikova (footballer) (born 1998), Belarusian footballer
Elena Novikova (born 1984), Ukrainian road cyclist
Irina B. Novikova (born 1975), Russian-American physicist
Ksenia Novikova (born 1980), Russian singer, actress, songwriter
Olesya Novikova, Russian ballet dancer
Teréza Nováková, née Lanhausová (1853–1913), Czech feminist author, editor, and ethnographer
Yuliya Novikova (born 1973), Russian film and stage actress

See also
Arvydas Novikovas (b. 1990), Lithuanian footballer 

Russian-language surnames